Shooting ranges in Switzerland are unique in Europe, in keeping with the strong shooting traditions and liberal gun laws that exist in Switzerland.

The sale of ammunition — limited to Swiss ordonnance calibers, but including Gw Pat 90 rounds for army-issue assault rifles — is subsidized by the Swiss government and made available at the many shooting ranges patronized by both private citizens and members of the militia. There is a regulatory requirement that ammunition sold at ranges must be used there for minors.

No permit is needed for an individual to transport an unloaded firearm to or from a shooting range, to or from an arms dealer, to or from an armory or to or from a private weapon purchase. To carry firearms in public or outdoors, a person must have a Waffentragschein, (weapon carrying permit), which in most cases is issued only to private citizens working in occupations such as security.

See also
Gun politics in Switzerland
Shooting sport
Shooting ranges in Norway
Shooting ranges in the United States
Schützenverein

References 

Switzerland
Society of Switzerland